Brown College may refer to:

Brown College (Minnesota), a for-profit career college with campuses in Minnesota
Brown College (Rice University), a residential college at Rice University
Brown College at Monroe Hill, a residential college at the University of Virginia
Brown University, Providence, Rhode Island
College of Brown University, the undergraduate section of Brown University
Brown Mackie College, a system of for-profit colleges